Edcouch is a city in Hidalgo County, Texas, United States. The population was 3,161 at the 2010 census. It is part of the McAllen–Edinburg–Mission and Reynosa–McAllen metropolitan areas.  The town was founded in 1927 and named for Edward Couch, landowner and banker.

Geography
Edcouch is located in eastern Hidalgo County at  (26.294354, −97.963410), at the intersection of State Highway 107 and Farm to Market Road 1015. Its neighboring cities are Elsa to the west and La Villa to the east.

Demographics

2020 census

As of the 2020 United States census, there were 2,732 people, 1,109 households, and 815 families residing in the city.

2000 census
At the 2000 census there were 3,342 people in 891 households, including 757 families, in the city. The population density was 3,573.9 people per square mile (1,372.7/km). There were 985 housing units at an average density of 1,053.3 per square mile (404.6/km).  The racial makeup of the city was 76.33% White, 0.63% African American, 0.63% Native American, 19.84% from other races, and 2.57% from two or more races. Hispanic or Latino people of any race were 97.13%.

Of the 891 households 50.3% had children under the age of 18 living with them, 56.6% were married couples living together, 23.0% had a female householder with no husband present, and 15.0% were non-families. 13.7% of households were one person and 8.1% were one person aged 65 or older. The average household size was 3.75 and the average family size was 4.13.

The age distribution was 37.1% under the age of 18, 11.1% from 18 to 24, 25.2% from 25 to 44, 17.5% from 45 to 64, and 9.1% 65 or older. The median age was 26 years. For every 100 females, there were 93.5 males. For every 100 females age 18 and over, there were 87.2 males.

The median household income was $18,618 and the median family income  was $20,208. Males had a median income of $18,708 versus $12,468 for females. The per capita income for the city was $6,096. About 43.4% of families and 48.1% of the population were below the poverty line, including 60.3% of those under age 18 and 37.6% of those age 65 or over.

Education
Edcouch is served by the Edcouch-Elsa Independent School District. Edcouch residents are also allowed to apply to magnet schools operated by the South Texas Independent School District.

References

External links
 Edcouch, Texas. Handbook of Texas

[Blood and Money] Thomas Thompson

Cities in Texas
Cities in Hidalgo County, Texas